Zarjazz was a record label and sub-label of Virgin Records.

Zarjazz was formed in 1984 by Madness, a British ska band. The label's first release was Feargal Sharkey's hit single "Listen to Your Father", on which Madness (minus Suggs) performed as Sharkey's backing group. Zarjazz also achieved success with album and single releases by Madness themselves, and with the charity record 'Starvation' (credited as Starvation) featuring members of Madness, UB40, the Pioneers and General Public. The record label dissolved in 1986. Other Zarjazz artists were the Fink Brothers (Suggs and Chas Smash), Charm School, and Tom Morley.

The label was run from an office on Caledonian Road in North London, which also houses Liquidator Studios. Madness still owns the studio, but currently rents the premises to Apollo 440.

See also
 List of record labels

References

British record labels
1984 establishments in England
1986 disestablishments in England
Record labels established in 1984
Record labels disestablished in 1986
Madness (band)
Zarjazz